Burmannia grandiflora is a flowering plant in the family Burmanniaceae found in Colombia, central Brazil, and Bolivia. It grows mostly on wet savannas, sandy soil, from sea level to a height of 1230 meters.

References

Burmanniaceae
Taxa named by Gustaf Oskar Andersson Malme